Eustacomyia is a genus of parasitic flies in the family Tachinidae. There are at least two described species in Eustacomyia.

Species
These two species belong to the genus Eustacomyia:
 Eustacomyia breviseta Malloch, 1927
 Eustacomyia hirta Malloch, 1930

References

Further reading

 
 
 
 

Tachinidae
Articles created by Qbugbot